Ceriagrion is a genus of damselfly in the family Coenagrionidae.
Species of Ceriagrion are small to medium size, generally brightly coloured damselflies. They are found across the Old World, Africa, Asia and Australia.

Species 
The genus Ceriagrion includes the following species:

Ceriagrion aeruginosum  – Redtail
Ceriagrion annulatum 
Ceriagrion annulosum 
Ceriagrion auranticum 
Ceriagrion auritum 
Ceriagrion azureum 
Ceriagrion bakeri 
Ceriagrion batjanum 
Ceriagrion bellona 
Ceriagrion calamineum 
Ceriagrion cerinorubellum 
Ceriagrion chaoi 
Ceriagrion citrinum 
Ceriagrion coeruleum 
Ceriagrion corallinum 
Ceriagrion coromandelianum 
Ceriagrion fallax 
Ceriagrion georgifreyi  – Turkish Red Damsel
Ceriagrion glabrum  – Common Orange, Common Pond-damsel, Common Citril
Ceriagrion hamoni 
Ceriagrion hoogerwerfi 
Ceriagrion ignitum 
Ceriagrion inaequale 
Ceriagrion indochinense 
Ceriagrion katamborae 
Ceriagrion kordofanicum 
Ceriagrion lieftincki 
Ceriagrion madagazureum 
Ceriagrion malaisei 
Ceriagrion melanurum 
Ceriagrion moorei 
Ceriagrion mourae 
Ceriagrion nigroflavum 
Ceriagrion nigrolineatum 
Ceriagrion nipponicum 
Ceriagrion oblongulum 
Ceriagrion olivaceum 
Ceriagrion pallidum 
Ceriagrion praetermissum 
Ceriagrion rubellocerinum 
Ceriagrion rubiae 
Ceriagrion sakejii 
Ceriagrion sinense 
Ceriagrion suave  – Suave Citril
Ceriagrion tenellum  – Small Red Damselfly
Ceriagrion tricrenaticeps 
Ceriagrion varians 
Ceriagrion whellani

References

Coenagrionidae
Zygoptera genera
Odonata of Asia
Odonata of Africa
Odonata of Europe
Odonata of Australia
Taxa named by Edmond de Sélys Longchamps
Damselflies
Taxonomy articles created by Polbot